Robert "Bob" Neyret (born 28 February 1934 in Grenoble) is a retired French dental surgeon and semi-professional rally driver who competed in beginning in 1954.  

Neyret was impressed by the victory of the Citroën DS in 1959 Monte-Carlo Rally and switched to that model.  In the 1961 Liège-Sofia-Liège 4000 km race won by accomplished professional driver Lucien Bianchi in a DS 19, Neyret won 3rd place overall in his DS 19, ahead of more than 280 competitors. 

Neyret won the Rallye du Maroc in 1969 and 1970 in a DS 21.  In 1972, when the event was part of the International Championship for Manufacturers, he finished second in a Citroën DS 21. At the same rally, Neyret also recorded his only World Rally Championship podium finishes; second in 1973 in a DS 23 and third in 1975 in an Alpine-Renault A110 1800.

 
His Team Esso Aseptogyll took part in the 24 Hours of Le Mans in 1977 and 1978, always with renowned French female drivers like Marianne Hoepfner and Christine Dacremont.

In 1989, his daughter Pascale Neyret won the Ladies' Cup Promotion in the Monte Carlo Rally, finishing 22nd in the general classification, with Carole Cerboneschi as co-driver on Lancia Delta Intégrale.

Since 2009, Neyret has become "Team Manager" at the head of a team of Citroëns, which take part, season after season, in Historic Rallies. Neyret competed in the 2015 Paris to Beijing classic car race in a 1967 DS 21, with many pictures to illustrate the journey.

References

External links
http://www.rallye-info.com/driverprofile.asp?driverid=210

1934 births
Living people
French rally drivers
Sportspeople from Grenoble